The Mondoro attack took place on 4 March 2022, when al-Qaeda-linked jihadists attacked a Malian military base, causing heavy casualties.

Background 
Throughout the war in Mali, Mondoro has been the site of numerous clashes between the Malian army and allies and al-Qaeda and allies.

The Malian army base in Mondoro was attacked simultaneously with the base in Boulikessi in 2019, killing 45 to 85 Malian soldiers. A second attack was repelled in 2021.

Attack 
The camp at Mondoro is usually staffed with 150 soldiers. The attack began at 6am local time and was carried out by several hundred jihadists, attacking from the north and east. The jihadists used vehicle-based bombs, which the Malian army countered with planes.

Malian forces did not request help from French Barkhane troops, due to the presence of Wagner Group in the area. Later in the day, Malian troops managed to recapture the base and assess casualties.

Losses and aftermath 
Later in the day, the Malian government announced they had lost 27 soldiers, with 33 injured. Seven soldiers were also reported missing. Due to the attack, Mali announced three days of mourning. The Malian government also claimed that 47 Jama'at Nasr al-Islam wal Muslimin (JNIM) fighters were killed.

AFP, citing an anonymous French military source, stated the Malian death toll was between 40-50, and multiple vehicles were seized. France 24 corroborated these claims, stating 47 Malian soldiers died.

JNIM claimed responsibility for the attack on March 8, claiming to have lost only four fighters and killing 30 Malian soldiers. A JNIM spokesman also claimed the Mondoro attack was perpetrated in response to massacres in Dogofry committed by the Malian army earlier that year.

References 

Mondoro
Mondoro
Mondoro
Mondoro